Syzygium wrightii is a species of plant in the family Myrtaceae. It is endemic to Seychelles.

References

Trees of Seychelles
wrightii
Vulnerable plants
Endemic flora of Seychelles
Taxonomy articles created by Polbot
Taxa named by John Gilbert Baker